"Burn Me Down" is a song written by Eddie Miller and Don Sessions, and recorded by American country music artist Marty Stuart.  The song was released in January 1992 as the fourth single from the album Tempted.  The song reached #7 on the Billboard Hot Country Singles & Tracks chart.

Critical reception
Lisa Smith and Cyndi Hoelzle of Gavin Report described the song positively, stating that "Marty lets the message smolder while the song blazes outta control."

Chart performance

Year-end charts

References

1992 singles
1991 songs
Marty Stuart songs
Song recordings produced by Tony Brown (record producer)
Songs written by Eddie Miller (songwriter)
MCA Records singles